Natterer may refer to:

People
Christian Natterer (born 1981), German politician
August Natterer (1868–1933), German artist 
Frank Natterer (born 1941), German mathematics professor 
Johann Natterer (1787–1843), Austrian explorer and naturalist

Other

Natterer's bat, Myotis nattereri